Triphenylarsine is the chemical compound with the formula As(C6H5)3. This organoarsenic compound, often abbreviated AsPh3, is a colorless crystalline solid that is used as a ligand and a reagent in coordination chemistry and organic synthesis. The molecule is pyramidal with As-C distances of 1.942–1.956 Å and C-As-C angles of 99.6–100.5°.

This compound is prepared by the reaction of arsenic trichloride with chlorobenzene using sodium as the reducing agent:

AsCl3 + 3 PhCl + 6 Na → AsPh3 + 6 NaCl

Reactions
Reaction of triphenylarsine with lithium gives lithium diphenylarsenide:
AsPh3  +  2 Li  →   LiAsPh2  +  LiPh

Triphenylarsine is the precursor to tetraphenylarsonium chloride, [AsPh4]Cl, a popular precipitating agent.

AsPh3 forms metal complexes with metals. Most are analogues of the corresponding triphenylphosphine derivatives.  Examples include [[IrCl(CO)(AsPh3)]]2, [[RhCl(AsPh3)3]], and [[Fe(CO)4(AsPh3)]].

Tetraphenylarsonium chloride  is prepared  from triphenylarsine:
(C6H5)3As  +  Br2   →   (C6H5)3AsBr2 
(C6H5)3AsBr2  + H2O  →  (C6H5)3AsO  +  2 HBr
 (C6H5)3AsO  +   C6H5MgBr  →  (C6H5)4AsOMgBr
(C6H5)4AsOMgBr  +  3 HCl  →  (C6H5)4AsCl.HCl  +  MgBrCl
(C6H5)4AsCl.HCl  +  NaOH  →  (C6H5)4AsCl  +  NaCl  +  H2O

References

Phenyl compounds
Organoarsenic compounds